Plaça del Duc de Medinaceli is a square in central Barcelona. It is part of Barri Gòtic, in the Ciutat Vella district, located between Passeig de Colom and Carrer de la Mercè, on a terrain formerly part of a 13th-century Franciscan convent until 1836. The square was projected after the disappearance of the old city walls and the convent in the 19th century.
It is named after the 16th century nobleman Luis de la Cerda y de la Vega, count of Medinaceli, Cogolludo and Arcos de Jalón, a descendant of the Montcada family, who gave away the terrain to the Franciscans.

Names
It had previously been known as plaça de sant Francesc and plaça dels Framenors, and from the construction of the square as we see it now, Manuel Azaña, Duque de Medinaceli and Barcas.

In popular culture
The square is famously featured in a scene of Pedro Almodóvar's film "Todo sobre mi madre".

Transportation
Barcelona Metro L3 station Drassanes.

References

External links
Pobles de Catalunya.cat

Plazas in Barcelona
Ciutat Vella